, also known as Koyasan Buddhist Temple, is a Japanese Buddhist temple in the Little Tokyo district of Downtown Los Angeles, California, United States. Founded in 1912, it is one of the oldest existing Buddhist temples in the North American mainland  region. The temple is a branch of Koyasan Shingon Buddhism and is the  North America regional headquarters for the school.

History
In 1909, the Reverend Shutai Aoyama, native and former chief priest of Kakuganji Temple in Toyama- ken, left Japan for the United States with the blessings of Archbishop Misumon Yuhan and his other superiors, “to observe the religious situation in North America, as well as propagate Shingon Buddhism. In 1912, with support and encouragement from some of the Los Angeles Japanese community’s leading citizens, Issei and Nisei temple members a like, he opened the first Shingon temple in the United States in a store front in Little Tokyo called Koyasan Daishi Kyōkai of Los Angeles or just Daishi Church. The Koyasan Shingon sect of Buddhism focuses on Shingon teachings compiled by Kobo Daishi (Kukai) in the Heian period.

In 1935, the Temple was elevated to the status of Koyasan Beikoku Betsuin, meaning it became the North American regional headquarters, recognized by the Koyasan Headquarters of Japan. In 1940, the Temple moved to its current location on East 1st Street, but the bombing of Pearl Harbor would forever changed the Japanese American community across the nation. Anti-Japanese sentiment ran rampant. Within a year, the temple in Los Angeles was closed, its hall and basement piled to the ceiling with members’ possessions, and its membership, both U.S. citizens and non-citizens alike, were relocated to internment camps during World War II.

Over the years, the temple began opening cultural and religious programs and classes for the local community. Prior to redevelopment in Little Tokyo in the 1980s, Koyasan served as the main hub of Japanese cultural events. In 1987, the temple hosted the Kechien Kanjo ritual, a service rarely conducted outside Japan. Two years later, the temple was designated the keeper of the Hiroshima Peace Flame, brought over from Japan by Los Angeles Mayor Tom Bradley. Starting in 1999, the temple underwent a ten-year renovation of the old facilities to meet with the city building codes; the building was especially retrofitted to fit the needs for the monthly Goma fire ritual service. In 2012, the temple celebrated its centennial anniversary, hosting a special goma fire ritual service presided over by Bishop Ekan Ikeguchi from Kagoshima. The temple celebrated its 110th anniversary in 2022 by hosting a special precept ceremony for members.

Building 

The first established site was a storefront in 1912 near Elysian Park. In 1920, the temple was moved to a larger building on Central Avenue. A tree was planted in front of the new building by Koyasan Temple members to commemorate the move. The Aoyama Tree is a 60 by 70-foot Moreton Bay Fig tree (Ficus macrophylla) and notable landmark in Little Tokyo was given historical status by the Los Angeles City Council in 2008. However, currently this tree faces a great threat of decades of neglect. After the former temple building was demolished, the tree was left without an irrigation system with the area immediately surrounding the tree was paved over, covering the tree's extensive roots system, denying the tree essential water.

The current building consists of a main hall, which measures 60x120 feet, and an annex that measures 40x50 feet. The main hall has a seating capacity of 600 people, and a grand scale altar where the traditional esoteric rituals are performed. The main Buddha in the main hall is Dainichi Nyorai of the Vajradhatu Mandala. There are several other esoteric deities enshrined in the main hall of the temple (Fudo Myoo, Yakushi Nyorai, Jizo, Kannon, and Kobo Daishi).

The second floor of the annex is a shrine to Kobo Daishi, designed for the purpose of religious gatherings and study classes especially for small groups, and accommodates a seating capacity of 100 people. It is known as the “Daishi-Do”, or the "Hall of Daishi".

The temple basement, located under the main altar, is used as an assembly room for scouting activities. In addition, an office, meeting room, reception room, kitchen, and several classrooms are provided for the purposes of the institution’s operations.

Bishops
The temple has had eight head bishops since its establishment in 1912. The fourth and fifth bishop, Reverends Seytsu Takahashi and Ryosho Sogabe, are credited with creating what we now see as the Koyasan Buddhist Temple. Reverend Seytsu Takahashi was recognized for his personal contributions and strong faith in campaigning for building a new temple; Takahashi served a one year term in 1982 as the 482nd Hōin-daikajō-i for Kongobuji Temple at Mt. Koya, passing away shortly afterward in 1983. Reverend Taido Kitagawa was a co-organizer of the temple's Boy Scout Troop 379, one of the oldest Boy Scout troops in the United States. Reverend Taisen Miyata, the seventh bishop and translator of Esoteric Buddhist texts, served from 1993 to 2007 and was acting bishop from 2011 to 2013.

Rev. Shutai Aoyama (1909-1921)
Rev. Hokai Takada (1921-1924)
Rev. Taido Kitagawa (1924-1933)
Rev. Seytsu Takahashi (1931-1982)
Rev. Ryosho Sogabe (1982-1991)
Rev. Chiko Inouye (1991-1993)
Rev. Taisen Miyata (1993-2007) 
Rev. Seicho Asahi (2007-2011)
Rev. Taisen Miyata (acting: 2011-2013)
Rev. Junkun Imamura (2015–2019)
Rev. Yuju Matsumoto (2020–present)

Boy Scout Troop 379

The temple also hosts Boy Scout Troop 379, formed in 1931, one of the oldest troops in existence in California. Future actor and gay rights activist George Takei was one of the troop's members.

Other names for the troop include AL Post 525, Koyasan, and Green Giant. The Commodore Perry Scouts were a junior marching and maneuvering corps based in Los Angeles, California. They were sponsored by the Commodore Perry American Legion Post 525 and the Koyasan Buddhist Temple.
Associated with the Los Angeles Boy Scout Troop 379, the Scouts boasted 164 Eagle Scouts among their ranks in 1935. Among the corps' awards were the state American Legion Championships in 1955, 1956, 1962, and 1963. The corps' colors are green, black, and white.

The troop was also featured in the 1953 movie, Mister Scoutmaster, with Clifton Webb and George "Foghorn" Winslow. In the film he mobilized the Troop, played by members of Koyasan Troop 379, to search for Foghorn as he was missing.

Later in 1971, the Drum & Bugle Corps, upon the request of the members, changed the name to Third Generation, as they were not nisei or issei generation Japanese Americans.

See also
Japanese American National Museum

External links

 Official Website
 Official Facebook Page

References

Buddhist temples in Los Angeles
Buddhist organizations
Internment of Japanese Americans
Japanese-American culture in California
Religious organizations established in 1912
Shingon Buddhism
Little Tokyo, Los Angeles
1912 establishments in California
20th-century Buddhist temples